Zummar, also spelled Zemar or Zumar, is both the name of an Iraqi subdistrict located in north Nineveh Governorate and of its seat, the town of Zummar. The population is a mix of Arabs and Kurds, most of whom work in agriculture. Wheat is the prime crop there. 

In August 2014, Zummar subdistrict fell to ISIL's hands. In October 2014, Zummar was recaptured by the Peshmerga.

Zummar town
Zummar town is the seat of Zummar subdistrict. It is located 60 km north west of Mosul city at the west bank of the river Tigris. Its population is 50,000 inhabitants.

Oil fields
The Zummar subdistrict is rich with oil. It contains two oil fields, both run by North Oil Company, yield a sort of heavy crude oil.

Ain zala oilfield was explored by a British company in 1939. It is 16 km long and 4 km wide. Production was delayed after World War II until 1951 when the Mosul oil company branch of Iraq Petroleum Company started production with 20,000 barrels per day, but the production degraded later to 5,000 barrels, as it is currently.
Batma oil field was discovered by Mosul oil company, a branch of Iraq Petroleum Company 1953. The oilfield is 12 km long and 6 km wide. The production commenced in that year with 50,000 barrels per day. The production has been stopped since 1990 due to the United Nations' financial and trade embargo ('sanctions') against Iraq after its invading Kuwait. Resumption of production has been postponed further after the Iraq War. Batma is considered a small field compared with other Iraqi fields, where its potential production is not more than 5,000 barrels per day.

References

Kurdish settlements in Iraq
Populated places in Nineveh Governorate
Subdistricts of Iraq
Populated places on the Tigris River